Mohammad-Al Obaidullah (20 August 1913 – February 1991) was an Indian cricketer. He played three first-class matches for Bengal in 1941/42.

See also
 List of Bengal cricketers

References

External links
 

1913 births
1991 deaths
Indian cricketers
Bengal cricketers
Cricketers from Kolkata